Lake Vodlozero is a large freshwater lake in the southeastern part of the Republic of Karelia, Russia. It is 36 km long and 16 km wide. There are more than 190 islands on the lake. Vodlozero is used for fishery. It freezes up in early November and stays icebound until early May. The largest tributary of the lake is the river Ileksa. Its outflow is the river Vodla (through its tributaries Sukhaya Vodla and Vama), that flows into Lake Onega.

See also
Vodlozersky National Park

References

LVodlozero
Vodlozero